The Brute is a 1953 Mexican drama film directed by Luis Buñuel and starring Pedro Armendáriz and Katy Jurado.

Plot
Impoverished tenants are being evicted from their block of flats by their elderly landlord, Cabrera, who wants to build a house on the site for himself. The tenants refuse to leave, so the landlord, at the prompting of his young wife, Paloma, tells his strongest slaughterhouse worker, Pedro, known as El Bruto, to get rid of the ringleaders. When Pedro moves into the landlord’s house to work for him as a retail butcher and enforcer, Paloma, who also works in the shop, is strongly attracted to him. They begin an affair.

Starting the campaign, Pedro punches one of the ringleaders, the father of Meche, and kills the sick man unintentionally. This precipitates the other tenants to find and attack him, ending in a nail being stuck in his shoulder. He bursts into an apartment and, finding Meche, asks her to remove it. He falls in love with her despite her initial rejection, and faces divided loyalties as the landlord treats him like a son. El Bruto has a suspicion that the landlord had an affair with his mother when she was his maid, and is indeed his father. 

When Pedro finds that Meche has been evicted and has been abandoned by the other tenants,  he proposes marriage and offers her a home. When Paloma, paying another clandestine visit to Pedro, finds out that he now lives with Meche, in her jealous rage, she tells Meche that he killed her father. Meche, horrified, flees. Pedro strikes her. She returns home and tells the landlord falsely that El Bruto ravaged her. Cabrera issues instructions for Pefro to come to his house. When he does, Cabrera insults him and his mother and tries to kill him. Instead, Pedro kills him. Prompted by Paloma, the police pursue him. The tenants are happy because they will no longer be evicted.

Cast
Pedro Armendáriz as Pedro
Katy Jurado as Paloma
Rosa Arenas as Meche
Andrés Soler as Andrés Cabrera
Roberto Meyer as Carmelo González
Beatriz Ramos as Doña Marta
Paco Martínez as  Don Pepe
Gloria Mestre as  María
Paz Villegas as María's mother
José Muñoz as Lencho Ruíz
Diana Ochoa as Lencho's wife
Ignacio Villalbazo as María's brother
Jaime Fernández as Julián García
Raquel García as  Doña Enriqueta
Lupe Carriles as  Maid
Guillermo Bravo Sosa as El Cojo
Benny García as El Gato
Olga de la Chietla as La Chinita

External links 
 

1953 drama films
1953 films
Mexican black-and-white films
Films directed by Luis Buñuel
1950s Spanish-language films
Mexican drama films
1950s Mexican films